The Minister of Public Service and Administration is a Minister in the Cabinet of South Africa. As of March 2023, the minister is Noxolo Kiviet.

References

External links
Department of Public Service and Administration

Lists of political office-holders in South Africa